Yeni Zuvand (known as Zuvandlı until 2001) is a village and municipality in the Masally Rayon of Azerbaijan. It has a population of 888.

References

Populated places in Masally District